AtlasGlobal, named Atlasjet until 31 March 2015, was a Turkish airline headquartered in Istanbul, which operated scheduled domestic and international passenger services as well as charter flights, mostly out of its base at Istanbul Airport. The airline filed for bankruptcy on February 12, 2020, and ceased operations permanently after that date.

History

Early years
The airline was established on 14 March 2001 and started operations on 1 June 2001. Formerly known as Atlasjet International Airlines, it was set up as a subsidiary of Öger Holdings. As of February 1, 2006, Öger's 45% share at Atlasglobal was taken over and Ali Murat Ersoy became the President of Board of Directors at Atlasglobal. The company is led by its CEO Sermed Temizkanhad 730 employees (as of 2017).

In August 2012, AtlasGlobal Airlines contracted Ryan International Airlines, a US airline, to operate religious pilgrimage flights to cities such as Medina and Tel Aviv. In January 2013 AtlasGlobal failed to fulfill the payments to Ryan International, which prompted the termination of the co-operation without advance notice. Ryan International Airlines, already in a bankruptcy reorganization process, was not able to recover from the loss and therefore faced impending financial difficulties, which led to its liquidation.

Operational issues and end of operations
On 26 November 2019, AtlasGlobal announced a temporary suspension of all flights due to a restructuring of the airline. It was further announced that all ticket sales would be suspended until 16 December 2019 with flights planned to resume by 21 December.

On 16 December 2019, Atlasglobal resumed scheduled flight operations, five days ahead of its previously announced return. Throughout the suspension it had maintained charter services, with two A321s serving domestic Turkish destinations as well Tehran and Baghdad. In a statement to the Sabah news agency, Atlasglobal said its revised business plan will see it focus more on charters as opposed to scheduled flights. It did not disclose which routes would be dropped as part of the adjustment.

On 7 January 2020, the airline announced it would be suspending operations again, until 9 February 2020. On 29 January 2020, it has been announced that AtlasGlobal returned their sole two Airbus A330-200s to their lessors. On 12 February 2020, Atlasglobal filed for bankruptcy and halted its operations immediately.

Destinations

, before suspending all flights, AtlasGlobal offered scheduled flights (excluding charter flights) to the following destinations:

Historic fleet
Over the years, the following aircraft types were operated:

Accidents and incidents
On 18 August 2007, Atlasjet Flight 1011 from Ercan, Northern Cyprus to Istanbul, Turkey, which was operated by a McDonnell Douglas MD-83 (registered TC-AKN), was hijacked by two passengers shortly after take-off. The perpetrators claimed to be members of Al Qaeda carrying explosives, and demanded the pilots divert the aircraft to Tehran, Iran. Instead, the aircraft landed at Antalya Airport in Turkey at 08:15 local time, officially in order to refuel. Negotiations with the local authorities began, during which all females and children on board were allowed to leave. A ruckus occurred when other passengers and crew tried to flee during which the hijackers surrendered. There were no notable injuries among the 138 other passengers and 5 crew members on board.
On 30 November 2007, Atlasjet Flight 4203 from Istanbul to Isparta crashed upon approaching Isparta Süleyman Demirel Airport, killing all 50 passengers and 7 crew members on board. The aircraft that operated this flight was wet-leased from World Focus Airlines.

See also 
 List of defunct airlines of Turkey

References

External links

Official website

Defunct airlines of Turkey
Airlines established in 2001
Airlines disestablished in 2020
2020 disestablishments in Turkey
Defunct charter airlines
Companies based in Istanbul
Turkish brands
Turkish companies established in 2001